Xylophanes pyrrhus is a moth of the  family Sphingidae.

Repartition 
It is found from Venezuela, Ecuador and Peru south to Bolivia.

Description 
The length of the forewings is 33–37 mm. It is similar to Xylophanes thyelia thyelia but larger and there are differences in the pattern on the forewing upperside, such as a smaller discal spot.

Biology 
Adults are on wing in August in Bolivia and September in Peru.

References

pyrrhus
Moths described in 1906